The Örebro Party (ÖP) is a local political party in Örebro, Sweden. Markus Allard is the party leader. According to Allard the party cannot be placed anywhere on the traditional left-right spectrum, and instead focuses on local issues. Some of its key issues include lowered wages for politicians, stricter migration policy, and free dental care.

The party runs candidates for seats in the municipal assembly of Örebro Municipality and the Örebro County Council. Since the 2022 elections, it has five seats in the municipal assembly and three in the regional assembly. Its symbol represents Svampen (The Mushroom), a water tower that is a prominent landmark in Örebro.

History

Split from the left 
The initiative to found the Örebro Party was taken in early 2014 by Markus Allard, who is also the first party leader. Allard had previously held positions as substitute member of the Örebro municipal council and district chairman of the Young Left in Örebro; in December 2013 he was expelled from the Left Party and its youth wing Young Left for "liking" the Revolutionary Front, a militant revolutionary socialist and anti-fascist organization, on Facebook and refusing to disavow it when questioned. Allard has stated that the real reason for his expulsion was that he was perceived as a threat to the established party bureaucracy.

While Allard has described himself as a Communist, and a Marxist, at its founding in March 2014 he defined the Örebro Party as "broad left". At that time the party considered itself a "local party that wants to carry on the labour movement's ideals", and "not interested in administrating the current society".

As a result of signing the petition required for ÖP to be registered as a party, a large number of Left Party members in Örebro were informed of the party's intention to expel them. This triggered backlash from several other Left Party members in social media, and a number of Left Party and Young Left members who had signed the petition later appeared on the party's list of election candidates while not joining ÖP as members. Throughout early 2014, several members of the Young Left were expelled for expressing support for Allard and his position on the Revolutionary Front, among them the writer Malcom Kyeyune and Axel Frick, Allard's replacement as district chairman of the Young Left in Örebro and an Örebro Party candidate.

In the September 2014 Swedish election, the party received 1,050 votes in the municipal council election in Örebro, and also some write-in votes in Örebro County for the Riksdag.

Entering the municipal assembly 
In February 2018, Allard stated that having decided to focus on "down-to-earth and local issues", the party membership had broadened since its foundation and he would no longer characterize it as either left or right. The same month , an Örebro police officer, joined the party. He had attracted attention the previous year for a Facebook post about his experience with overrepresentation of violent crime among immigrants.

In the 2018 election, the party gained two seats on the Örebro municipal council, where it is represented by Allard and Springare. They subsequently gained representation on the Örebro municipal executive committee, with Allard as full-time municipal commissioner. Since achieving municipal representation in 2018 the party has gotten considerable attention for Allard's distinctly polemical debating-style in the municipal chamber, with a number of speeches going viral.

2021 bus rapid transit petition 
During 2021, the Örebro Party participated in a petition campaign demanding a public plebiscite on the planned introduction of bus rapid transit alongside the Liberal Party, the Sweden Democrats and local groups. In October of that year the group turned in 15 500 signatures to the municipality, well over the statutory limit required to call a plebiscite In Örebro according to Swedish law. The municipality would subsequently disqualify around a third of the signatures, resulting in the petition falling short such that no vote would be held. 

The municipality's assessment process has been heavily criticized by the Örebro Party for being co-led by an elected Social Democratic politician, repeated inconsistencies in the several rounds of recounting as well as systematic irregularities in the transcription of personal identity numbers allegedly found by the Örebro Party in their own audit. This criticism has led to comparisons between the party and former US president Donald Trump in Swedish national media as well as accusations of Marxism-Leninism by the local leader of the centre-right Moderate Party. The decision to disqualify the signatures is the subject of ongoing appeal by all parties involved.

Policies and activities
The party is heavily opposed to political corruption and high politician incomes and wants to reduce the wages of politicians and senior officials. In keeping with this policy, Allard promised to donate half of his monthly allowance to fund a planned series of social programmes. In August 2019 the party announced the first such project to be social pole-walking (sauvakävely) for pensioners. During the COVID-19 pandemic the party has used this fund to provide face masks to municipal elderly care workers, while heavily criticising what is perceived as a political gag-order on care workers regarding poor equipment and conditions. Another project was announced via Allard's personal Facebook page in 2022, wherein 30,000 SEK were donated to a local homeless aid organisation. The donation was followed by a fundraising drive by the party's social media followers.

Other issues include making plebiscites easier to enact and more potent, increased social housing, subsidies for youth recreation, and free dental care. The party advocates stricter migration policies, strong secularism, and assimilationist policies such as immediate closure of the Islamic charter schools. It opposes continued privatization of health care, elderly care, public housing and municipal education, among other things. During the 2018–2022 term the party has opposed prestige public projects it considers wasteful, such as the proposed Palace of Culture and bus rapid transit.

The party actively supports the creation of similar parties in other municipalities such as the Tierp List, variously described as external branches of the Örebro party.

References

External links
Official website

2014 establishments in Sweden
Anti-fascism in Sweden
Political parties established in 2014
Socialist parties in Sweden
Swedish local political parties